Jachindra Rout is an Oriya poet and translator, who writes in both English and Oriya.

Career 
He has published over 12 poetry collections, 3 essay collections, a travelogue and numerous translations, including The Voice of the Struggle, an autobiography of S.J Bhagabat Prasad Mohanty.. His poetry collections have been published in both English and Oriya.

Early life 
Rout was born on October 7, 1965 in Gobandia, Palai Jajpur, situated near the Lalitagiri and Olasuni Gumpha, the eldest son of Jaladhara and Gelhamani Rout. He has B.A. and M.A. degrees from Utkal University, and also completed P.G.D.T.E, C.I.E.F.L. qualifications in Hyderabad.

Literary Awards 
 Poet of the year (2003) Poet International.
 Kabi Kanja (Subha sankha)
 Poet of the State (Sathi Orissa )
 Gunduchimusa Saman-2009
 Editor Choice Awards (Holi)
 Sattavdi Sammman (Biswa Oriya Prajna Parisada, Dhenkanal)

Works in English 

 The Voice of the Struggle
 Khandagiri & Udayagiri
 Listen Silently
 Chitropala Higher English Grammar
 A Criticism to Kaju Kasi Ikeda
 Easy English Grammar for Children

Works in Oriya 
 Dutta Akhi
 Dathabiz
 Kharabela
 Krushna Ku Chithi
 Amanisha nka Kabita

References

Sources

1965 births
Indian male poets
Living people
Poets from Odisha
Odia-language poets
English-language writers from India